INE, Ine or ine may refer to:

Institutions
 Institut für Nukleare Entsorgung, a German nuclear research center
 Instituto Nacional de Estadística (disambiguation)
 Instituto Nacional de Estatística (disambiguation)
 Instituto Nacional Electoral, Mexico's public organization responsible for organizing federal elections
 Shanghai International Energy Exchange

People
 Ine of Wessex ( – after 726), king of Wessex (688–726)
 Ine Barlie (born 1965), Norwegian sport wrestler
 Kusumoto Ine (1827–1903), Japanese physician
 Ine Gevers (born 1960), Dutch curator and writer
 Ine Hoem (born 1985), Norwegian jazz singer
 Ine ter Laak-Spijk (1931–2002). Dutch athlete
 Ine Lamers (born 1954), Dutch photographer and video installation artist
 Ine Poppe (born 1960), Dutch artist, journalist and writer
 Ine Schäffer (born 1923), Austrian athlete who competed mainly in the shot put
 Ine Eriksen Søreide (born 1976), Norwegian politician
 Ine Wannijn (born 1982), Belgian cyclist

Places 
 Ine, Kyoto, Japan
 İne, Kazan, Turkey

Other uses
 -ine, a suffix used in chemistry
 Ince and Elton railway station, England
 Indo-European languages
 Ine Airport, on Arno Atoll, Marshall Islands

See also
Ines (disambiguation)